The 12659 / 60 Gurudev Express is a Express train belonging to the Indian Railways southern zone that runs between  and  in India.

Background
The Gurudev Express is a joint tribute to Rabindranath Tagore and southern saint Sree Narayana Guru.

Coaches
The 12659 / 60 Gurudev Express has one AC 2-tier, two AC 3-tier, 13 sleeper class, three general unreserved & two SLR (seating with luggage rake) coaches and two high capacity parcel van coaches. It does not carry a pantry car coach.

As is customary with most train services in India, coach composition may be amended at the discretion of Indian Railways depending on demand.

Service

As the average speed of the train is slightly above , as per railway rules, its fare includes a Superfast surcharge.

Schedule

Routing
The 12659 / 60 runs from  via
,

Reverse

Train reverse in Visakhapatnam railway station

Traction
Later, an  based WAP-4 locomotive takes the reversed direction and pulls the train to its destination.

Rake Composition

 1 AC II Tier
 2 AC III Tier
 12 Sleeper Coaches
 3 General
 2 moter Cum Parcel van
 2 General can luggage

References

External links
12659 Gurudev Express at India Rail Info
12660 Gurudev Express at India Rail Info

Named passenger trains of India
Rail transport in Howrah
Rail transport in Tamil Nadu
Rail transport in Kerala
Rail transport in Andhra Pradesh
Rail transport in Odisha
Rail transport in West Bengal
Transport in Nagercoil
Express trains in India